The following highways are numbered 263:

Canada
Prince Edward Island Route 263
 Quebec Route 263
Saskatchewan Highway 263

Japan
 Japan National Route 263

United States
 Alabama State Route 263
 Arkansas Highway 263
 California State Route 263
 Connecticut Route 263
 Florida State Road 263
 Georgia State Route 263 (former)
 Indiana State Road 263
Kentucky Route 263
 Maryland Route 263
 Minnesota State Highway 263
 Montana Secondary Highway 263
 New Mexico State Road 263
 New York State Route 263
 Pennsylvania Route 263
 South Carolina Highway 263
 Tennessee State Route 263
 Texas State Highway 263 (former)
 Texas State Highway Spur 263
 Farm to Market Road 263 (Texas)
 Utah State Route 263 (former)
 Virginia State Route 263
 Washington State Route 263